Bobov (or Bobover Hasidism) is a Hasidic community within Haredi Judaism, originating in Bobowa, Galicia, in southern Poland, and now headquartered in the neighborhood of Borough Park, in Brooklyn, New York.

Bobov developed into a leading Hasidic dynasty through the leadership of Shlomo Halberstam, a Holocaust survivor.

Bobov and all Bobov institutions, are currently led by the Grand Rabbi Benzion Halberstam.

Bobov communities are found in the Williamsburg section of Brooklyn; in Monsey, New York; Los Angeles; Lakewood, New Jersey; Montreal; Toronto; Antwerp; and London. In Israel, Bobov has large branches in Jerusalem, Bnei Brak, Ashdod, Elad, Beitar Illit, and an enclave, "Kiryas Bobov", in Bat Yam.

Outline of Bobov's Hasidic rabbinical lineage

History

First Rebbe of Bobov, Shlomo Halberstam (1847 – 1905)
 
Bobov originated with Shlomo Halberstam, who was the grandson of Grand Rabbi Chaim Halberstam of Sanz, in the Galician village of Bobowa.

While most of the early yeshivos (Talmudical academies) originated in Lithuania, the 19th century saw the opening of similar institutions in Poland. The first yeshiva in Poland was established by the first Bobover Rebbe in 1881 in Vishnitsa, where he was rabbi then; and it later moved with him to Bobov.

Second Bobover Rebbe, Benzion Halberstam (1874 – 1941)
His work was continued by his son, Grand Rabbi Ben Zion Halberstam, author of Kedushas Tzion. The Bobov Yeshiva was originally situated only in the town of Bobov itself. However, under his guidance, the court grew in numbers, with Hasidic youth flocking to Bobov. Subsequently, as many as sixty branches of the yeshiva under the name Etz Chaim were established throughout Galicia.

During World War II, the Bobov Hasidic movement was destroyed. The second Rebbe himself was murdered in the Holocaust, together with family members and thousands of his followers.

Third Bobover Rebbe, Shlomo Halberstam (1908 – 2000)
Barely 300 Hasidim survived, and the Rebbe's son, Shlomo Halberstam, took it upon himself to rebuild Bobov. He first settled in the West Side of Manhattan, later moving to Bedford-Stuyvesant in Brooklyn. The yeshiva was located on the west side of Brooklyn Avenue, at 184 Brooklyn Avenue, between Park Place and Prospect Place; it later moved to nearby Borough Park. Rabbi Shlomo was known as a very wise man and a gaon (exalted) in middos (good attributes). He was noted for his steadfastness in not taking sides in disputes. This brought him great popularity and respect.

Over the more than fifty years that Rabbi Shlomo was Rebbe of Bobov, he founded and built a worldwide network of synagogues, Hasidic schools for boys and girls, mesivtas (high schools), and post-high school houses of learning. Besides schools, a summer camp for boys was founded in 1957 in Ferndale, New York, and a girls camp, Camp Gila, was founded a few years later. At the time of his death in August 2000, he was mourned by more followers than his father had in pre-war Poland. His Hebrew date of death was the first of Av, the same as that of Aaron, the Biblical High Priest. At his funeral it was publicly announced that his oldest son Reb Naftali would succeed him as Rebbi, and his younger brother Rabbi Benzion Halberstam would serve as "Rav Hatzair" [Young Rabbi].   Many have noted their similar characteristics of Ohev Shalom VeRodef Shalom (Loved peace and pursued peace).

Fourth Bobover Rebbe, Naftali Halberstam (1931 – 2005)
With Shlomo Halberstam's death, his older son, Naftali Zvi Halberstam, succeeded him. Naftali Zvi died on March 23, 2005 (12th of Adar II, 5765), at age seventy-four, leaving a wife, two daughters, and two sons-in-law: one, Yehoshua Rubin, Rav of Bobov-45, and the other, Mordechai Dovid Unger, Rebbe of Bobov-45.

Fifth and current Rebbe of Bobov, Benzion Halberstam (1955 –)
After Grand Rabbi Naftali Tzvi Halberstam of Bobov died in 2005, a dispute arose among Bobover Hasidim as to who should succeed the dynasty leadership; the majority preferred Ben Zion Aryeh Leibish Halberstam, the younger brother of the late Rebbe, while another smaller group of people preferred his son-in-law Mordechai Dovid Unger. For seven years, while a prolonged arbitration proceeding at a beth din was going on, both groups claimed the rightful Bobov leadership. After seven years of deliberation, the beth din ruled, among other decisions regarding assets, that Ben Zion Aryeh Leibish Halberstam,  brother of the previous Rebbe, has the only rights to the name “Bobov” and is the rightful successor. however, the ruling allowed Mordechai Dovid Unger to be named Bobov-45 rebbe.

First and current Grand rabbi of bobov-45 Rabbi Mordechai Dovid Unger Shlita
Bobov-45 is an offshoot of the Bobov dynasty, also headquartered in Borough Park. It has branches in Williamsburg and Monsey, New York; Lakewood, New Jersey; Los Angeles; Montreal; Toronto; London; Manchester; Antwerp; and an enclave "Yishuv of Chasidei Bobov-45" in Union, New Jersey. In Israel, Bobov-45 has branches in Jerusalem, Bnei Brak, Beit Shemesh, Ashdod, Elad, and Beitar Illit.

Rabbi Mordechai Dovid Unger is the first Grand Rabbi of "Bobov-45". He is the younger son-in-law of the fourth Bobover Rebbe, Naftali Zvi Halberstam. Yehoshua Rubin, the older son-in-law of Halberstam, is the current dayan and rabbinical leader of the sect.

History of Bobov-45
The third Bobover Rebbe, Shlomo Halberstam, rebuilt the Bobov Hasidic dynasty in the United States, after losing his wife and most of his children in the Holocaust; his son, Naftali, survived. After the war, Shlomo Halberstam remarried, and had a son, Ben Zion Aryeh Leibish Halberstam,

Naftali became the fourth rebbe upon his father's death. He had no sons, but left two daughters, one of whom married Yehoshua Rubin, and the other Rabbi Mordechai Dovid Unger Shlita.

In 2005, after the death of Naftali Halberstam, a breakaway group of Bobover Hasidim loyal to his son-in-law, Rabbi Mordechai Dovid Unger Shlita, set up a grand hall under his leadership on 45th Street in Borough Park, Brooklyn. A leadership dispute then arose between Unger and Ben Zion Aryeh Leibish Halberstam, who both claimed the title of Bobover Rebbe.

The dispute was taken to a beth din (arbitration panel), which ruled that Rabbi Halberstam held the rights to the name "Bobov", and to all Bobov institutions. 
Rabbi Unger was allowed to use the name Bobov, provided that a distinguishing word be added to it. The qualifying suffix "-45" was henceforth adopted in tribute to the street on which the community center of the sect was located at the time. In addition, the beth din ordered Bobov to pay $6,200,000 to Bobov-45's Rebbe and dayan in twenty-five quarterly installments, as an allotment of their faction's share of the inheritance of the Bobov enterprise's assets, it is unknown what the value of the assets were at the time.

As the Rebbe of Bobov-45, Rabbi Mordechai Dovid Unger Shlita has also been active in the wider Jewish community.

Institutions
Community institutions, such as a synagogue, have been built within Bobov-45. 
Other Bobov infrastructure includes 
a Yeshiva,
beth midrash (study hall), 
cheder (elementary school), 
yeshiva ketana (secondary school), 
mesivta, 
girls school, 
day camp, 
and wedding halls.

See also 

 Hasidic Judaism in Poland

References

 
Hasidic dynasties
Hasidic Judaism in New York City
Jews and Judaism in Brooklyn
Jews and Judaism in England
Jews and Judaism in Jerusalem
Jews and Judaism in Antwerp
Jewish groups in Poland